Cornell Loubser (born 27 July 1994) is a South African female deaf swimmer. She represented South Africa at the Deaflympics in 2013 and 2017. Cornell has also won medals in the South African national deaf swimming championships and in the 2015 World Deaf Swimming Championship.

She was also the solitary medalist for South Africa at the 2017 Summer Deaflympics as she claimed silver medals in the women's 100m butterfly and 200m butterfly events.

References 

1994 births
Living people
South African female butterfly swimmers
Deaf swimmers
South African deaf people
People from Potchefstroom
20th-century South African women
21st-century South African women